Beulah Ecton Woodard (November 11, 1895 – July 13, 1955) was an African-American sculptor and painter based in California. Woodard was the first African American artist to have a solo exhibition at the Los Angeles Museum of History, Science and Art.

Biography
Beulah Ecton was born near Frankfort, Ohio, on November 11, 1895. She was the daughter of Mr. and Mrs. William P. Ecton. Her father was a Civil War veteran. She developed a lifelong fascination with African culture at the age of 12 when her family was visited by an African national. Her family moved to California, where she lived near Los Angeles in what would become Vernon. She attended Los Angeles Polytechnic High School, where she studied architectural drawing. After completing high school, Woodard had to work as a maid for the years after graduation until she was in her thirties.

Woodard started working with clay in her early 30s, but was dissuaded from the pursuit by her family in 1926. In 1928,  she married Brady Woodard and took courses at the Otis Art Institute, the Los Angeles Art School, and the University of Southern California. She counted Glen Lukens among her tutors, as well as Peter David Edstrom, one of the founders of the Los Angeles County Museum of Art. Russian prince Paul Troubetzkoy was also one of Woodard's teachers.

Artistic career 
Woodard had her first show in February 1935 in the storefront window for the California News weekly. Her work was displayed at the Vernon Branch Library and the Los Angeles Central Library. She was the first African-American artist to exhibit a one-person show at the Los Angeles County Museum with her 1937 solo exhibition. The exhibition was up for eight weeks and consisted of "a series of clay and papier-mâché masks, which were decorated with elaborate beading and feathers and based upon the artist's anthropological research." She was collected by Los Angeles art matron and Los Angeles Head Librarian Miriam Matthews and many pieces were bought by Golden State Mutual Life Insurance Company for their corporate art collection. Matthews organized an exhibition of Woodard's work at the Los Angeles Public Library's Vernon Branch. Woodard came to Matthew's attention after California News publisher James R. Smith displayed her sculptures in the window of the weekly newspaper.

Woodard used various media to create her sculptures, including bronze, wood, terracotta, and papier-mâché. In her sculptures, she replicated the braided hairstyles, jewelry and headdresses of Ekoi, Luba, Hemba and Mangbetu peoples. Her terracotta work Maudelle, made ca. 1937–38, is a realistic portrait of African-American concert dancer Maudelle Bass Weston and was created without the use of sculptural models or drawings.

Woodard was active in her community and lectured at various educational institutions. She was a member of Our Authors Study Circle, a women's book club affiliated with the Association for the Study of African American Life and History that persuaded the office of mayor Fletcher Bowron to enact Los Angeles' first Negro History Week. In 1937 she was a key organizer of the Los Angeles Negro Art Association. In 1950 she established the Eleven Associated Artist Gallery. The short lived Los Angeles artists co-op included African American contemporaries Alice Taylor Gafford and William Pajaud and Chinese American artist Tyrus Wong.

She placed third in the All-City Art Festival in 1953.

Woodard died on July 13, 1955, at the age of 59, prior to her work being shown in Germany at multiple exhibitions.

See also 

 List of African-American visual artists
 List of 20th-century women artists

Gallery

Further reading

References

1895 births
1955 deaths
African-American sculptors
American women sculptors
Sculptors from Ohio
20th-century American sculptors
20th-century American women artists
People from Ross County, Ohio
Artists from Los Angeles
Sculptors from California
Otis College of Art and Design alumni
University of Southern California alumni
African-American women artists
20th-century African-American women